HD 70642 is a star with an exoplanetary companion in the southern constellation of Puppis. It has an apparent visual magnitude of +7.17, which is too dim to be readily visible to the naked eye. The system is located at a distance of 95.6 light-years from the Sun based on parallax measurements, and is drifting further away with a radial velocity of +49.4 km/s. It came to within  of the Solar System some 329,000 years ago.

This may be considered to be a solar analog star, being similar in physical properties to the Sun. It is a G-type main-sequence star with a stellar classification of G6V CN+0.5. It is comparable to the age of the Sun, estimated to be in the range of 2–6 billion years old. Although chromospherically inactive a magnetic field has been detected. This star has about the same mass and radius as the Sun, is slightly cooler and less luminous, and is richer in abundance of iron relative to hydrogen. It is spinning at a leisurely rate, showing a projected rotational velocity of 1.6 km/s.

Planetary system
A long period planet companion to HD 70642 was announced in 2003. This planet orbits in a circular orbit (e=0.034) at 3.232 AU. The star is so like Sol that its habitable zone is in the same place (~ 1 AU). The jovian ensures the stability of an Earth-mass planet at 1 AU. This system is one of the most similar in conditions to the Solar System than any other currently known planetary systems.

See also
 Gliese 777
 HD 28185
 Pi Mensae
 HIP 11915
 Lists of exoplanets

References

External links
 Solstation: HD 70642 / CD-39 4247

G-type main-sequence stars
Planetary systems with one confirmed planet

Puppis
Durchmusterung objects
070642
040952
0304